= Belfort Instrument Company =

Weather instrument manufacturer

- Company type: Private
- Industry: Instrumentation, Sensing, Aviation
- Founded: 1876
- Headquarters: Baltimore, Maryland
- Website: www.belfortinstrument.com

Belfort Instrument Company is a company that makes various meteorological products, including the DigiWx Automated Weather System, which has been installed in various airports. They are also known for their Fisher & Porter rain gauge.

They currently have a contract with the NOAA's Air Resources Laboratory to evaluate climate observing systems.
